He Zhaowu (September 14, 1921 – May 28, 2021) was a Chinese historian, translator, and professor at Tsinghua University. He was proficient in English, French and German.

Biography
He was born in Beijing, on September 14, 1921, while his ancestral home was in Yueyang, Hunan. In 1939, he was accepted to the National Southwestern Associated University, where he graduated in 1943. From 1956 to 1986, he worked at the Chinese Academy of Social Sciences as an assistant research fellow and then research fellow. In 1986, he joined the faculty of Tsinghua University. He was a guest professor at Columbia University and the University of Marburg. He died in Beijing, on May 28, 2021, aged 99.

Works

Translations

Awards
 2015 Lifetime Achievement Award in Translation

References

1921 births
2021 deaths
People from Beijing
Chinese historians
20th-century Chinese translators
21st-century Chinese translators
National Southwestern Associated University alumni
Victims of the Cultural Revolution